Sheep Hills is a place near Biggin in Derbyshire, United Kingdom. It is mainly a rural area, its geographical context is described as farm, grassland and woodland.

See also
List of places in Derbyshire

References

Forests and woodlands of Derbyshire